The 1901 North Carolina Tar Heels baseball team represented the University of North Carolina at Chapel Hill in the 1901 college baseball season. The team was suspended from the conference the next season for paying its players.

Schedule

References 

North Carolina Tar Heels baseball seasons
North Carolina
Southern Intercollegiate Athletic Association baseball champion seasons
North Carolina baseball